William Andrew Murray (18 July 1881 – 17 October 1942) was an Irish athlete who competed at the 1908 Summer Olympics in London, representing Great Britain. He was born in Ballincollig, Ireland. In the 100 metres event, Murray took fourth place in his first round heat to be eliminated without advancing to the semifinals.

References

Sources
 profile
 
 
 

1881 births
1942 deaths
British male sprinters
Olympic athletes of Great Britain
Athletes (track and field) at the 1908 Summer Olympics
Irish male sprinters
Sportspeople from County Cork